Juan-David Nasio (born 1942 in Rosario) is an Argentinian psychiatrist, psychoanalyst and writer. He is one of the founders of Séminaires Psychanalytiques de Paris.

Biography
After qualifying as a doctor from the University of Buenos Aires, Nasio completed his residency as a psychiatrist at the hospital in Lanús. He emigrated to France in 1969 where he attended the classes of Jacques Lacan. In may 1979, he did a course about the theme "subject of the unconscious", in the seminar of Lacan.

He was a professor at the University of Paris VII Sorbonne for 30 years from 1971 and for three years had a seminar in the école Freudienne de Paris (1977-1980). After its dissolution in 1980, he founded the Séminaires Psychanalytiques de Paris (1986). He received the French Legion of Honour.

In addition to participating in Lacan's seminars and translating his Écrits into Spanish, he has authored numerous books in French, translated in 13 languages.

Distinctions 
 1999 : Knight of Legion of Honor.
 2001 : Illustrious citizen of the city of Rosario.
 2004 : Officer of ordre national du Mérite.
 2012 : Doctor honoris causa of the University of Buenos Aires and of the University of Tucuman.
 2015 : Doctor honoris causa of the Autonomous University of Mexico State.
 2016 : Doctor honoris causa of the University of Rosario and of the University 21 Century of Córdoba.
 2017 : Doctor honoris causa of the Southern Connecticut State University.

Bibliography 
 L'Inconscient à venir, Paris, Payot, 1993
 (dir.) Aux limites du transfert, Rochevignes, 1985.
 L’Enfant du miroir, coauteur avec Françoise Dolto, Payot, 2002
 (dir.) Le Silence en psychanalyse, Payot, 2001
 Enseignement de 7 concepts cruciaux de la psychanalyse, Payot, 2001
 L'Hystérie ou l'enfant magnifique de la psychanalyse, Payot, 2001
 Cinq Leçons sur la théorie de Jacques Lacan, Payot, 2001
 (dir.) Introduction aux œuvres de Freud, Ferenczi, Groddeck, Klein, Winnicott, Dolto et Lacan, Payot, 1994
 Le Livre de la douleur et de l'amour, Payot, 2003
 Le Plaisir de lire Freud, Payot, 2001
 (dir.) Les Grands Cas de psychose, Payot, 2000
 Un psychanalyste sur le divan, Payot, 2009 (Poche)
 L’Œdipe. Le concept le plus crucial de la psychanalyse, Payot, 2012
 Le Fantasme. Le plaisir de lire Lacan, Payot, 2005
 La Douleur d’aimer, Payot, 2005
 La Douleur Physique, Payot, 2006
 Mon corps et ses Images, Payot, 2013
 Les Yeux de Laure. Nous sommes tous fous dans un recoin de notre vie, Payot, 2009
 Introduction à la Topologie de Lacan, Payot, 2010
 Comment agir avec un adolescent en crise ?, Payot, 2013
 L’Inconscient, c’est la Répétition !, Payot, 2012
 L’Inconscient de Vallotton, RMN - Grand Palais ; Musée d'Orsay, 2013
 Art et psychanalyse, Payot, 2014
 Oui, la psychanalyse guérit !, Payot, 2016

English translations
 Book of Love and Pain: The Thinking at the Limit with Freud and Lacan. Translated by David Pettigrew and François Raffoul (Albany: SUNY Press, 2003)
 Five Lessons on the Psychoanalytic Theory of Jacques Lacan. Translated by David Pettigrew and François Raffoul (Albany: SUNY Press, 1998)
 Hysteria: The Splendid Child of Psychoanalysis. Translated by Susan Fairfield (New York: Other Press, 1998)
 Oedipus: The Most Crucial Concept in Psychoanalysis. Translated by David Pettigrew and François Raffoul (Albany: SUNY Press, 2010) - Awarded with the Choice Price (2011)
 A Psychoanalyst on the Couch. Translated by Stephanie Grace Schull, revised and edited by David Pattigrew and François Raffoul (Albany: SUNY Press, 2012)
 Why Do We always Repeat the Same Mistakes ? Currently this book is being translated into English by David Pettigrew and François Raffoul. (Albany: SUNY Press)

References

External links
“Portraits de la psychanalyse française”
“Presentación de Juan David Nasio”

Argentine psychoanalysts
French psychologists
Poststructuralists
Argentine emigrants to France
Academic staff of the University of Paris
1942 births
Living people
Chevaliers of the Légion d'honneur
Officers of the Ordre national du Mérite
People from Rosario, Santa Fe
Argentine writers in French